Liophrurillus is a monotypic genus of araneomorph spiders in the family Phrurolithidae, containing the single species, Liophrurillus flavitarsis. It was first described by J. Wunderlich in 1992 as a possible corinnid sac spider, and was moved to Phrurolithidae in 2014. It has only been found in Europe and North Africa.

References

Monotypic Araneomorphae genera
Phrurolithidae